α-Furil, also commonly known as 2,2'-furil, is a furan compound.

References
 Material Safety Data Sheet
 Chemexper.com

2-Furyl compounds
Diketones